KXMX (105.1 FM) is a radio station licensed to serve Muldrow, Oklahoma. The station broadcasts a variety format and is owned by G2 Media Group LLC.

References

External links
KXMX's official website

XMX